The MP 05 (French : Métro sur Pneu d'appel d'offres de 2005) is a rubber-tyred electric multiple unit with driverless operation ordered by the RATP in 2005 for the Paris Métro. The original 49 units were designed to replace the older MP 89s on line 1 in order to automate the line. An additional fleet of 18 MP 05s was ordered for deployment on the line 14 by 2017 in order to improve service frequencies and to prepare for the line's northern extension towards Mairie de Saint-Ouen, as well as provide service enhancements to Line 1. The trainsets are being constructed by Alstom.

The MP 05 trains are the second Paris Métro rolling stock to include air-conditioning, with the MF 01 rolling stock being the first.

History

Automation of Line 1 
Following the success of the completely automated line 14 during the early 2000s, the RATP planned to automate additional lines.  Automation would not only allow for Paris to remain as a model for technological innovations in the railway industry but also would permit an increase in the number of lines in normal service when RATP workers are striking.

The RATP first focused on line 1, the busiest line of the network and the line most used by tourists. However, the line's MP 89 CC rolling stock was not equipped to be automated. The RATP opted to replacing the rolling stock rather than retrofitting it since the existing MP 89 trainsets could be repurposed as-is to replace the aging MP 59s on line 4.

On 23 October 2015 Alstom and the RATP celebrated the production of the 67th and final MP 05 railcar .

Manufacturer 
The RATP signed a contract with Alstom, the only manufacturer with experience in constructing rubber-tyred metros, on 20 October 2005 for the delivery of 49 MP 05 trains, with the option of an additional ten trains, spare parts, and related tools. The total order was for €474 million ($US640 million)—about €9.7 million ($US13 million) per train.

The Alstom factories in France and Canada working under the contract are:
Valenciennes, constructing the trains and integrating the related equipment;
Le Creusot, constructing the bogies;
Ornans, constructing the motors;
Tarbes, constructing the traction equipment;
Villeurbanne and Montreal, (Canada), constructing the boarding systems.

Deliveries and service on Line 1 

Alstom began constructing the first trains in 2008 in Valenciennes. The first train was delivered to the RATP at the beginning of May 2009, to the service depot at Fontenay.  At the end of March 2010, the second train (501) was delivered to the same depot.  At the ground-breaking for the construction of automatic boarding doors in the stations, the press was invited to view train 502 on 12 June 2009.  On 3 November 2011 trains 501 to 509 went into regular passenger service. As of 1 April 2013, there are 49 trains are in regular passenger service, with an option for 10 more trains if needed :fr:MP 05.

Reinforcement of Line 14 
On 27 May 2009 the STIF ordered four MP 05 trains at a cost of around €50 million ($US70 million) to supplement line 14's existing fleet of MP 89CA trains. These four trains (numbered 581–584), which entered service beginning in 2013, are in the same RATP livery as older trains on the line. An additional 14 more trains were later ordered in preparation for the northern extension towards Mairie de Saint-Ouen. The additional trains (which were to be numbered 585–598) will be in joint RATP–STIF livery.

Reinforcement of Line 1 

As of May 2015, five additional trains (pulled from the 18 trains originally ordered for Line 14) have been placed into service on Line 1. These trains are numbered 550 to 554, and are painted in the RATP/STIF livery. This leaves railcars 585 through 594 to be assigned to Line 14.

Formations

  use trains in a 6-car formation (4M2T).

As of 1 March 2022, 53 six-car sets (501 to 554) were allocated to Fontenay Depot for use on M1 Line.(one set is non affected)

  use trains in a 6-car formation (4M2T).

As of 10 February 2023, 11 six-car sets were allocated to St Ouen Depot for use test on M4 Line.

  use trains in a 6-car formation (4M2T).

As of 23 January 2023, 2 six-car sets  were allocated to St Ouen Depot for use on M14 Line.

R : car not motorized ("remorque" or "voiture" in french)
N : power car without driver's cab ("motrice" in french)
S : end car with or without driver's cab ,not motorized

Transfer of Line 14 trains to Line 4 (2022)

 it is expected that around 2020 the next generation MP 14 railcars of 8-car formations will begin to replace the MP 89CA and MP 05 stock. This will allow both precedent stock to be reassigned to other lines, such as Line 1 or Line 4.

With the deliveries of the MP 14 ongoing as of January, 2022, it is currently planned for all MP 05 trainsets on Line 14 to be moved over to Line 4, where they will operate alongside their MP 89CA counterparts and some (6-car) MP 14 units. Trains that are being prepared for transfer are being repainted in the new Île-de-France Mobilités white/blue livery.

Features and appearance 

The MP 05s are based on the MP 89CAs and their exterior appearance is the same; however, the MP 05 have brighter LED-type headlights compared to the MP 89.

The RATP opted for an interior also similar to that of the MP 89, with only the colors differing: the blue and gray tones replaced by an off-white tone, the floor colored brick red, and the seats with a rainbow pattern, in a design was conceived by Yo Kaminagai.

The trains are the first production sets to be equipped with the Dilidam multimedia system (first introduced in one MF 01 set) and security cameras; as well, they are the first rubber-tired rolling stock with an air conditioning system, with an output of 11 kW, housed on the roof. Most trains are equipped with rubber interconnecting gangways that are similar to that of the MP 89CA stock. However, trains #533 and onward are equipped with MF 01 type gangways.

Technical specifications 

The technical specifications are similar to those of the MP 89, with some modern adaptations such as the electrical system, a multimedia system, and climate control.  The MP 05's traction system is the same as the MF 01's.  The MP 05 will have a lower noise level than the MP 89 due to improvements in the transmission.
Length: 
Width: 
Height: 
Composition: S+N+N+N+N+S
Number of seats: 144
Number of folding seats: 72
Standing passenger capacity: 578 (4 passenger per )
Three doors per car (automatic)
Power: 6 x  (1 induction motor per bogie)
Speed: 
Starting acceleration:

Other Systems 

While the MP 05 stock is only confined to the Paris Metro, there is speculation that a variant could eventually be produced for the Lausanne Metro's M3 Line. Plans for the new line have indicated for rolling stock that is consistent with the MP 89CA variant stock that currently operates along the M2 Line.

The MPM-10 or "Azur" which circulates on the network of Montreal, in Canada is derived from the Mp05.
It is a more recent version of the Mp05 benefiting from technological contributions arrived during the meantime (such as power electronics).

Notes

External links 
 TRUCK (bogie)

MP 2005
Paris Métro line 14
Paris Métro line 1
Alstom multiple units
Electric multiple units of France
750 V DC multiple units